RTI Systems (Radio Technical and Information Systems) is one of the largest defense contractors in Russia, with revenues for $753.5 million in 2016. RTI develops and produces long-horizon radars, information tools, rocket technology, integrated communication, and safety systems.

The Russian Ministry of Defense is the company's main customer. RTI also collaborates with Rosoboronexport to market its products abroad. In 2015 the company launched a project to develop the communications and broadcasting infrastructure of the Russian Arctic region. In 2017 the company was hit by sanctions from the US State Department.

Subsidiaries
Subsidiaries of the company:
 Radio Engineering Institute named after academician A.L. Mintz (RTI Mints) - air defence radars including the Dnestr and Voronezh systems. Formerly headed by, and now named after, Soviet scientist Alexander Lvovich Mints.
 OKB - Planeta
 Saransk Television Plant
 ROSS.SPETSTEHMONTAZH
 Radio Engineering And Information Systems Aerospace Defense
 Yaroslavl Radio Plant - radio communications systems for military and civilian applications
 Dubna Machine-Building Plant N.P. Fedorova
 RTI-Radio
 Sistema - Sarov
 MTU Saturn
 High Technologies And Strategic Systems
 CENTER - TELCO
 Center for Advanced Design Vympel - Sistema
 Mednogorsk Electrotechnical Plant of Uralelectro
 MATERIK
 Uralinstrument
 UralElyektro
 SPLAV-DMZ
 ELION
 Scientific Research Institute of Precision Engineering
 Sitronics - microelectronics and telecommunications
 Mikron Group - semiconductors, integrated circuits, and microprocessors
 Research Institute of Molecular Electronics
 Klen
 RTI Mikroelektronika
 Mikron Security Printing
 Konnektor Optiks
 Lasertech
 IKAR Engineering Center

References

External links
 Official website 
 	

 
Sistema
Defence companies of Russia
Companies based in Moscow